The 2022 Women's Revelations Cup (31 August – 6 September 2022) was an international association football tournament organized by Mexican Football Federation (FMF) for women's under-17 national teams. This was the inaugural edition of the tournament and took place in León, Guanajuato, Mexico. The 2022 tournament featured four nations preparing for the FIFA U-17 Women's World Cup taking place in India in October, including Canada, Chile, Colombia, and host Mexico. Two matches were played per day in a round robin system, with the team accumulating the most points winning the title. On 6 September 2022, Colombia and Mexico tied in the final match, resulting in the Colombia women's U-17 team finishing as champions.

Venue 
The host city was announced on 20 July 2022.

Format
Four U-17 teams were announced as participants for the inaugural edition of the tournament. They played against each other in a round-robin format for a total of 3 matches per team. The team with the most points were declared winners.

Tiebreakers:
Greater goal difference
Highest number of goals scored
Highest number of points between tied teams

Results
All times are local, CDT (UTC−5).

Goalscorers

Awards
The following awards were given at the conclusion of the tournament:

References

External links 
 Women's Revelations Cup

Women's Revelations Cup
Youth association football competitions for international teams
International association football competitions hosted by Mexico
2022 in women's association football
2022 in youth association football